Susan Blake is an American politician from the state of South Dakota.

Blake served in the South Dakota House of Representatives for District 13 from 2009 to 2012. She was the Democratic Party's nominee for Lieutenant Governor of South Dakota in the 2014 gubernatorial election.

Blake lives in Sioux Falls, South Dakota.

References

External links

Living people
Politicians from Sioux Falls, South Dakota
Democratic Party members of the South Dakota House of Representatives
Women state legislators in South Dakota
21st-century American politicians
21st-century American women politicians
Year of birth missing (living people)